The 2003 Canadian Professional Soccer League season was the sixth season for the Canadian Professional Soccer League. The season began on May 24, 2003 and concluded on October 5, 2003 with the Brampton Hitmen defeating Vaughan Sun Devils 1-0 to capture the CPSL Championship (known as the Rogers CPSL Cup for sponsorship reasons). The victory marked Brampton's first championship title, and the final was played at Cove Road Stadium in London, Ontario. During the regular season the Ottawa Wizards and the Hamilton Thunder won their respective conferences. Ottawa became the second CPSL franchise to go undefeated throughout the regular season.

Unfortunately the season was plagued with controversy as the Wizards withdrew from the playoff competition, due to a dispute with the CPSL Executive Committee. Another controversy stemmed from a quarterfinal match between Brampton and Toronto Croatia, where Toronto won the match on penalties, but was reversed by the league due to Toronto using an ineligible coach and general manager. On a positive note the league's television program the CPSL Soccer Show recorded the highest ratings of any other Sunday program shown on Rogers TV.

Changes from 2002 season 
The 2003 season saw the league decrease by one team due to the fact that the York Region Shooters merged with the Vaughan Sun Devils to unite the York Region territory. The Montreal Dynamites moved to the Montreal suburb of Laval and changed their team name accordingly.

Teams

Final standings

Eastern Conference

Western Conference

Rogers CPSL Championship playoffs

Quarterfinals

Semifinals

Rogers CPSL Championship

2003 scoring leaders
Full article: CSL Golden Boot

CPSL Executive Committee 
A list of the 2003 CPSL Executive Committee.

Individual awards

The annual CPSL awards ceremony was held at German-Canadian Club on October 5, 2003 in London, Ontario. The Ottawa Wizards finished on top with the most wins with two awards. The undefeated Eastern Conference champions produced the Rookie of the Year with McDonald Yobe, a former Malawian international. After conceding the lowest number of goals the league voted New Zealand journeyman Simon Eaddy with the Goalkeeper of the Year award. Phil Ionadi a former CNSL and USL A-League veteran captained the Brampton Hitmen to a CPSL Championship, and in returned was named the MVP.

Carlo Arghittu of St. Catharines Wolves another former CNSL and USL A-League veteran was given the Golden Boot for finishing as the league's top goalscorer. Domagoj Sain was given his second consecutive Defender of the Year award. After a disastrous 2002 season Toronto Supra brought in Jose Testas a former Primeira Liga, and Segunda Divisão player to manage the club. Testas immediately changed the club into a championship contender by finishing second in their division, and for his achievement was granted the Coach of the Year award. The Durham Flames received their second Fair Play award for being the most disciplined team. While Michael Lambert who officiated the championship final was given his second Referee of the Year award.

References

External links
Rocket Robin's Home Page of the 2003 CPSL Season

2003
2003 domestic association football leagues
Canadian Professional Soccer League